Darlington Memorial Hospital is an acute NHS hospital providing healthcare for people living in southern County Durham, England. It is managed by the County Durham and Darlington NHS Foundation Trust.

History
The hospital has its origins in the Darlington Dispensary established in the Market Buildings in 1808. It moved to Russell Street as the Darlington Hospital and Dispensary in 1864 and moved to Greenbank Road as the Darlington General Hospital in 1884. A new purpose-built hospital was established in Hollyhurst Road in the mid-1920s: the memorial hall, which commemorates people from Darlington who died in the First World War, stems from this era. The new hospital was officially opened in 1933 by Prince George (who later became the Duke of Kent), fourth son of George V.

The hospital was re-built in the late 1970s and re-opened in its new facilities in 1980. A state of the art MRI scanner was installed at the hospital in June 2018.

Services
Services include an accident and emergency department which has the capability to deal with most types of trauma.

See also
 List of hospitals in England

References

External links
 County Durham and Darlington Foundation NHS Trust website
 NHS Hospital Ratings

County Durham and Darlington NHS Foundation Trust
NHS hospitals in England
Hospital buildings completed in 1933
Hospitals in County Durham
Buildings and structures in Darlington